Behemoth is a steel roller coaster located at Canada's Wonderland in Vaughan, Ontario. Designed and developed by Swiss manufacturer Bolliger & Mabillard (B&M), Behemoth opened to the public in May 2008 as the tallest and fastest roller coaster in Canada, a claim it held until 2012 when Leviathan opened at the same park. Behemoth is similar to Diamondback (Kings Island), Intimidator (Carowinds), Goliath (La Ronde) and Nitro (Six Flags Great Adventure).

With its high speeds, tall heights and rapid changes in both direction and elevation, Behemoth is one of the most aggressive thrill rides in the park. It is also one of the park's most efficient, able to maintain a high hourly passenger capacity.

The ride features a prototype seating arrangement to ensure an unobstructed view for every rider – a first for a roller coaster of this type. It features five air-time hills, a hammerhead turn and two helixes.

History 
Behemoth was announced on 27 August 2007. The estimated C$26 million ride represented the single biggest investment in the 27-year history of Canada's Wonderland. When completed, Behemoth became the 15th roller coaster at the park.

After 17.5 months of planning and construction, steel construction of the track and supports was completed on 22 January 2008. The ride was officially opened on 24 April 2008 for Media Day. On Season Pass Preview Night, the ride was open to season pass holders on 25 April 2008. Behemoth opened to the public on 4 May 2008.

For the 2014 season, seat belts were added to the trains.

Characteristics 

Behemoth is rated a five out of five (double black diamond) according to Wonderland's Attraction Rating System. This rating specifies that the ride will have "high speeds and/or heights, aggressive and unexpected forces and rapid directional or elevation change."

Behemoth has a high throughput and will accommodate approximately 1,545 passengers an hour, making it one of the most efficient roller coasters in the park.

Train 

Behemoth's three open-air steel and fiberglass trains feature a prototype v-shaped staggered seating arrangement to ensure an unobstructed view for every rider. This prototype design is a first for Bolliger & Mabillard roller coasters which was later reproduced for Diamondback at Kings Island, Intimidator at Carowinds and Shambhala: Expedición al Himalaya at PortAventura Park.

The trains are colored red, orange and yellow, distinguished by their coloured fronts. Each of the trains comprise eight cars, seating four guests each for a total capacity of 32. Each passenger is seated in a bucket seat restrained by a lap bar harness and a seatbelt, identical to Leviathan's restraint system. Some persons over a certain weight/waist size cannot be accommodated by this arrangement.

Track 
The angle of the first descent is approximately 75 degrees. The track includes trim brakes and magnetic brakes for smoothness.

Station 
A two-story sheltered station house contains the ride loading and unloading area. The ground floor of the station contains the maintenance area for the trains, equipped with Radiant Heaters.

At the boarding area, the station features three colour-coded cabinets for loose belongings – one designated for each of the three trains. The operator's booth is also located on this platform.

Gift shop 
Unlike most of the park's other attractions, Behemoth is one of the rides at the park to have a gift shop. The shop sells ride memorabilia and displays the photos taken during the ride.

Ride experience 

The ride features a prototype seating arrangement to ensure an unobstructed view for every rider. The Behemoth experience lasts for approximately three minutes and subjects the rider to a maximum speed of  achieved in less than 3.9 seconds followed by five air-time hills, a hammerhead turn and two helixes. From the top, a passenger can clearly see the iconic CN Tower to the left and overlook the entire park to the right. At the base of the first drop, the train banks a few degrees to the right and climbs the first air-time hill and descends. Following this, the train climbs up to a hairpin 180-degree hammerhead turn to the left. The train descends from the height of the turn to travel up and over three more air-time hills. After the hills, the train climbs up a steep slope into the mid-course brake run.

After the momentary reduction in speed, the train turns to the right and descends into a downward 540-degree helix. Immediately following the first helix, the train climbs into an upward 270-degree helix to the left. Following the climb is a small descent and a final hill. The train climbs up from the final hill into the terminal brake run. The train waits at the terminal brake run until it is cleared for return by the station. The train proceeds forward and turns 180-degrees to the left to return to the station.

Reception 

Behemoth is one of the most popular attractions at Canada's Wonderland and it has enjoyed a great deal of success since its establishment. The ride appeals to a wide demographic with park staff noting that both young children and senior citizens line up for the attraction.

Awards 
The Golden Ticket Awards is an annual set of awards given out by Amusement Today, a newspaper published for the amusement industry. The rankings are selected by an international poll conducted by the newspaper. When Behemoth debuted in 2008, it ranked third as the Best New Ride of the year.

See also 
 List of Canada's Wonderland attractions

References

External links 

 
 Official Behemoth Forward Point-of-View 3D Video
 Official Behemoth Aerial Isolated Track Rendering

Roller coasters introduced in 2008
Roller coasters in Ontario
Roller coasters operated by Cedar Fair
Hypercoasters manufactured by Bolliger & Mabillard